Euspondylus monsfumus is a species of lizard in the family Gymnophthalmidae. It is endemic to Venezuela.

References

Euspondylus
Reptiles of Venezuela
Endemic fauna of Venezuela
Reptiles described in 2001
Taxa named by Abraham Mijares-Urrutia
Taxa named by Josefa Celsa Señaris
Taxa named by Alexis Arends Rodríguez